The Uttarakhand High Court is the High Court of the state of Uttarakhand in India.

The Uttarakhand High Court was established on 9 November 2000 after the separation of the state of Uttarakhand from Uttar Pradesh.

The sanctioned judge strength at the time of creation in 2000 was 7; this was increased to 9 in 2003. Justice Ashok Desai was the inaugural holder of the office. Former Chief Justices of Uttarakhand Sarosh Homi Kapadia and Jagdish Singh Khehar later went on to become Chief Justice of India. Vipin Sanghi is the current Chief Justice of the Uttarakhand High Court. He assumed office on 28 June 2022.

History 
The Uttarakhand High Court is a relatively new addition to India's judiciary system. The building of Uttarakhand High Court was constructed by Santoni MacDonald in 1900.

Uttarakhand was carved out from the state of Uttar Pradesh on 9 November 2000 under the Uttar Pradesh Reorganisation Act, 2000. At the time of the creation of the state, the High Court of Uttarakhand was also established on the same day. Prior to the establishment of the Uttarakhand High Court, the state came under the jurisdiction of the Allahabad High Court.

The Uttarakhand High Court is located in Nainital, a scenic hill station in the northern part of the state.

The High Court consisted of just five court rooms at the beginning but later court rooms have been added. A huge Chief Justice Court Block and a Block of Lawyers’ chambers were built in 2007.

Landmark judgements

Status of rivers as legal persons

In March 2017, Uttarakhand High Court mandated that the rivers Ganges and Yamuna as well as all water bodies are "living entities" i.e. "legal person" and appointed 3 persons as trustees to protect the rights of rivers against the pollution caused by the humans.

Rohit Sagar v. State of Uttarakhand

Rohit Sagar v. State of Uttarakhand (2021) is case where Uttarakhand High Court held that the legal adult have the fundamental right to choose their own partners and directed the Uttarakhand Police to provide necessary protection for the individuals and their property.

List of sitting judges of the Uttarakhand High Court

There are currently five sitting judges including the Chief Justice, with six posts of judges lying vacant.
Following is the list of the current serving judges of the Uttarakhand High Court, ordered by seniority.

Registrar General
Vivek Bharti Sharma is the current Registrar General of the Uttarakhand High Court. He Assumed office on 4 April 2022.

List of judges elevated to the Supreme Court of India

List of judges elevated as Chief Justice of other High Courts

List of former judges

See also
Chief Justice of Uttarakhand
List of judges of the Uttarakhand High Court
High courts of India
List of sitting judges of the high courts of India
Supreme Court of India
List of sitting judges of the Supreme Court of India
Bar Council of Uttarakhand
District Courts of India
Nyaya panchayat
Uttarakhand Lok Adalat
Uttarakhand Lokayukta
Judiciary of India

References

External links
 The High Court of Uttarakhand, official website
 Jurisdiction and Seats of Indian High Courts
  Judge strength in High Courts increased
 High Court of Uttarakhand

Government of Uttarakhand
Nainital
2000 establishments in Uttarakhand
Courts and tribunals established in 2000